An exchange-traded fund (ETF) is a type of investment fund and exchange-traded product, i.e. they are traded on stock exchanges. ETFs are similar in many ways to mutual funds, except that ETFs are bought and sold from other owners throughout the day on stock exchanges whereas mutual funds are bought and sold from the issuer based on their price at day's end. An ETF holds assets such as stocks, bonds, currencies, futures contracts, and/or commodities such as gold bars, and generally operates with an arbitrage mechanism designed to keep it trading close to its net asset value, although deviations can occasionally occur. Most ETFs are index funds: that is, they hold the same securities in the same proportions as a certain stock market index or bond market index. The most popular ETFs in the U.S. replicate the S&P 500, the total market index, the NASDAQ-100 index, the price of gold, the "growth" stocks in the Russell 1000 Index, or the index of the largest technology companies. With the exception of non-transparent actively managed ETFs, in most cases, the list of stocks that each ETF owns, as well as their weightings, is posted daily on the website of the issuer. The largest ETFs have annual fees of 0.03% of the amount invested, or even lower, although specialty ETFs can have annual fees well in excess of 1% of the amount invested. These fees are paid to the ETF issuer out of dividends received from the underlying holdings or from selling assets.

An ETF divides ownership of itself into shares that are held by shareholders. The details of the structure (such as a corporation or trust) will vary by country, and even within one country there may be multiple possible structures. The shareholders indirectly own the assets of the fund, and they will typically get annual reports. Shareholders are entitled to a share of the profits, such as interest or dividends, and they would be entitled to any residual value if the fund undergoes liquidation.

ETFs may be attractive as investments because of their low costs, tax efficiency, and tradability.

As of August 2021, $9 trillion was invested in ETFs globally, including $6.6 trillion invested in the U.S.

In the U.S., the largest ETF issuers are BlackRock iShares with a 35% market share, The Vanguard Group with a 28% market share, State Street Global Advisors with a 14% market share, Invesco with a 5% market share, and Charles Schwab Corporation with a 4% market share.

Closed-end funds are not considered to be ETFs, even though they are funds and are traded on an exchange. Exchange-traded notes are debt instruments that are not exchange-traded funds.

Investment uses and benefits
Among the advantages of ETFs are the following, some of which derive from the status of most ETFs as index funds:

Costs
Since most ETFs are index funds, they incur low expense ratios because they are not actively managed. An index fund is much simpler to run, since it does not require security selection, and can be done largely by computer. 

Unlike mutual funds, ETFs do not have to buy and sell securities to accommodate shareholder purchases and redemptions. And thus, an ETF does not have to maintain a cash reserve for redemptions and saves on brokerage expenses. ETFs typically have extremely low marketing, distribution and accounting expenses, and most ETFs do not have 12b-1 fees.

Over the long term, these cost differences can compound into a noticeable difference. However, some mutual funds are index funds as well and also have very low expense ratios, and some specialty ETFs have high expense ratios. 

To the extent a stockbroker charges brokerage commissions, because ETFs trade on stock exchanges, each transaction may be subject to a brokerage commission. In addition, sales of ETFs in the United States are subject to transaction fees that the national securities exchanges must pay to the SEC under section 31 of the Securities Exchange Act of 1934, currently 0.00221% of the net proceeds from the transaction. Mutual funds are not subject to commissions and SEC fees; however, some mutual funds charge front-end or back-end loads, while ETFs do not have loads at all.

Taxation

ETFs are structured for tax efficiency and can be more attractive tax-wise than mutual funds. 

Unless the investment is sold, ETFs generally generate no capital gains taxes, because they typically have low turnover of their portfolio securities. While this is an advantage they share with other index funds, their tax efficiency compared to mutual funds is further enhanced because ETFs do not have to sell securities to meet investor redemptions.

In the U.S., whenever a mutual fund realizes a capital gain that is not balanced by a realized loss, the mutual fund must "distribute" the capital gains to its shareholders and the shareholders must pay capital gains taxes on the amount of the gain (unless such investment is held in an individual retirement account), even if the distribution is reinvested. This can happen whenever the mutual fund sells portfolio securities, whether to reallocate its investments or to fund shareholder redemptions. In contrast, ETFs are not redeemed by investors; any investor who wants to liquidate generally would sell the ETF shares on the secondary market, so investors generally only realize capital gains when they sell their own shares for a gain.

In most cases, ETFs are more tax-efficient than mutual funds in the same asset classes or categories. 

An exception is some ETFs offered by The Vanguard Group, which are simply a different share class of their mutual funds. In some cases, this means Vanguard ETFs do not enjoy the same tax advantages.

In other cases, Vanguard uses the ETF structure to let the entire fund defer capital gains, benefiting both the ETF holders and mutual fund holders.

In the United Kingdom, ETFs can be shielded from capital gains tax by investing in them via an Individual Savings Account (ISA) or Self-Invested Personal Pension (SIPP), in the same manner as many other shares. Because UK-resident ETFs would be liable for UK corporation tax on non-UK dividends, most ETFs which hold non-UK companies sold to UK investors are issued in Ireland or Luxembourg.

The tax efficiency of ETFs are of no relevance for investors using tax-deferred accounts or investors who are tax-exempt, such as certain nonprofit organizations.

Trading

ETFs can be bought and sold at current market prices at any time during the trading day, unlike mutual funds and unit investment trusts, which can only be traded at the end of the trading day. Also unlike mutual funds, since ETFs are publicly traded securities, investors can execute the same types of trades that they can with a stock, such as limit orders, which allow investors to specify the price points at which they are willing to trade, stop-loss orders, margin buying, hedging strategies, and there is no minimum investment requirement. Because ETFs can be cheaply acquired, held, and disposed of, some investors buy and hold ETFs for asset allocation purposes, while other investors trade ETF shares frequently to hedge risk or implement market timing investment strategies. 

Options, including put options and call options, can be written or purchased on most ETFs – which is not possible with mutual funds. Covered call strategies allow investors and traders to potentially increase their returns on their ETF purchases by collecting premiums (the proceeds of a call sale or write) on call options written against them. There are also ETFs that use the covered call strategy to reduce volatility and simplify the covered call process.

Market exposure and diversification
If they track a broad index, ETFs can provide some level of diversification. Like many mutual funds, ETFs provide an economical way to rebalance portfolio allocations and to invest cash quickly. An index ETF inherently provides diversification across an entire index, which can include broad-based international and country-specific indices, industry sector-specific indices, bond indices, and commodities.

Transparency
The SEC generally requires ETFs to be transparent and issuers generally are required to publish the composition of the ETF portfolios daily on their websites. However, the SEC does allow certain actively managed ETFs to be non-transparent - i.e. they do not have to disclose exactly what they own.

ETFs are priced continuously throughout the trading day and therefore have price transparency.

Types

In the United States, most ETFs are structured as open-end management investment companies, the same structure used by mutual funds and money market funds, although a few ETFs, including some of the largest ones, are structured as unit investment trusts. ETFs structured as open-end funds have greater flexibility in constructing a portfolio and are not prohibited from participating in securities lending programs or from using futures and options in achieving their investment objectives.

Index ETFs
Most ETFs are index funds that attempt to replicate the performance of a specific index. Indexes may be based on the values of stocks, bonds, commodities, or currencies. An index fund seeks to track the performance of an index by holding in its portfolio either the contents of the index or a representative sample of the securities in the index. 

Many funds track U.S. stock market indexes; for example, Vanguard Total Stock Market ETF tracks the CRSP U.S. Total Market Index, and ETFs that track the S&P 500 are issued by The Vanguard Group, iShares, and State Street Corporation. Other funds track international stock indexes; for example, Vanguard Total International Stock Index tracks the MSCI All Country World ex USA Investable Market Index, while the iShares MSCI EAFE Index tracks the MSCI EAFE Index, both invest solely in companies that are not based in the United States. Many smaller ETFs use unknown, untested indices.

ETFs replicate indexes and such indexes have varying investment criteria, such as minimum or maximum market capitalization of each holding. For example, the S&P 500 only contains large- and mid-cap stocks, so any ETF that tracks this index will not contain small-capitalization stocks. Others such as iShares Russell 2000 Index replicate an index composed only of small-cap stocks. There are many style ETFs such as iShares Russell 1000 Growth and iShares Russell 1000 Value. The iShares Select Dividend ETF replicates an index of high dividend paying stocks. Other indexes, on which ETFs are based, focus on a specific industry, such as banks or technology, or specific niche areas, such as sustainable energy or environmental, social and corporate governance. They can also focus on stocks in one country or be global.

There are also ETFs, such as Factor ETFs, that use enhanced indexing, which is an attempt to slightly beat the performance of an index using active management.

Exchange-traded funds that invest in bonds are known as bond ETFs. Government bond ETFs thrive during economic recessions because investors sell stocks and buy safer treasury bonds.

Bond ETFs generally have much more market liquidity than individual bonds.

Some index ETFs invest 100% of their assets proportionately in the securities underlying an index, a manner of investing called replication. Other index ETFs such as the Vanguard Total Stock Market Index Fund, use representative sampling, investing 80% to 95% of their assets in the securities of an underlying index and investing the remaining 5% to 20% of their assets in other holdings, such as futures, option and swap contracts, and securities not in the underlying index, that the fund's adviser believes will help the ETF to achieve its investment objective. There are various ways the ETF can be weighted, such as equal weighting or revenue weighting. For index ETFs that invest in indices with thousands of underlying securities, some index ETFs employ "aggressive sampling" and invest in only a tiny percentage of the underlying securities.

Some index ETFs, such as leveraged ETFs or inverse ETFs, use investments in derivatives to seek a return that corresponds to a multiple of, or the inverse (opposite) of, the daily performance of the index.

Commodity ETFs
Commodity ETFs invest in commodities such as precious metals, agricultural products, or hydrocarbons such as petroleum. They are similar to ETFs that invest in securities, and trade just like shares; however, because they do not invest in securities, commodity ETFs are not regulated as investment companies under the Investment Company Act of 1940 in the United States, although their public offering is subject to review by the U.S. Securities and Exchange Commission (SEC) and they need an SEC no-action letter under the Securities Exchange Act of 1934. They may, however, be subject to regulation by the Commodity Futures Trading Commission.

Commodity ETFs are generally structured as exchange-traded grantor trusts, which gives a direct interest in a fixed portfolio. SPDR Gold Shares, a gold exchange-traded fund, is a grantor trust, and each share represents ownership of one-tenth of an ounce of gold.

Most commodity ETFs own the physical commodity. SPDR Gold Shares owns over 40 million ounces of gold in trust, iShares Silver Trust owns 18,000 tons of silver, Aberdeen Standard Physical Palladium Shares owns almost 200,000 ounces of palladium, and Aberdeen Standard Physical Platinum Shares ETF owns over 1.1 million ounces of platinum. However, many ETFs such as the United States Oil Fund by United States Commodity Funds only own futures contracts, which may produce quite different results from owning the commodity. In these cases, the funds simply roll the delivery month of the contracts forward from month to month. This does give exposure to the commodity, but subjects the investor to risks involved in different prices along the term structure, such as a high cost to roll. They can also be index funds tracking commodity indices.

Currency ETFs
Currency ETFs enable investors to invest in or short any major currency or a basket of currencies. They are issued by Invesco and Deutsche Bank among others. Investors can profit from the foreign exchange spot change, while receiving local institutional interest rates, and a collateral yield.

Actively managed ETFs

While most ETFs are index funds, some ETFs, particularly bond ETFs, do have active management. Actively managed ETFs are usually fully transparent, publishing their current securities portfolios on their websites daily. But some actively managed ETFs are not fully transparent. A transparent actively managed ETF is at risk from arbitrage activities by people who might engage in front running since the daily portfolio reports can reveal the manager's trading strategy. Some actively managed equity ETFs address this problem by trading only weekly or monthly. Actively managed debt ETFs, which are less susceptible to front-running, trade more frequently.

Actively managed bond ETFs are not at much of a disadvantage to bond market index funds since concerns about disclosing bond holdings are less pronounced and there are fewer product choices. 

The largest actively managed ETFs, each bond ETFs with approximately $14 billion in assets, are the JPMorgan Ultra-Short Income ETF, which charges 0.18% in annual fees, and the Pimco Enhanced Short Duration ETF, which charges 0.36% in annual fees.

Actively managed ETFs compete with actively managed mutual funds. While both seek to outperform the market or their benchmark and rely on portfolio managers to choose which stocks and bonds the funds will hold, there are four major ways they differ. Unlike  actively managed mutual funds, actively managed ETFs trade on a stock exchange, can be sold short, can be purchased on margin and have a tax-efficient structure.

Inverse ETFs

Inverse ETFs are constructed by using various derivatives for the purpose of profiting from a decline in the value of the underlying benchmark or index. It is a similar type of investment to holding several short positions or using a combination of advanced investment strategies to profit from falling prices. Many inverse ETFs use daily futures as their underlying benchmark.

Leveraged ETFs
Leveraged exchange-traded funds (LETFs or leveraged ETFs) attempt to achieve daily returns that are a multiple of the returns of the corresponding index. Leveraged index ETFs are often marketed as bull or bear funds. For example, a leveraged bull ETF fund might attempt to achieve daily returns that are 2x or 3x those of the Dow Jones Industrial Average or the S&P 500. A leveraged inverse exchange-traded fund may attempt to achieve returns that are -2x or -3x the daily index return, meaning that it will gain double or triple the loss of the market. To achieve these results, the issuers use various financial engineering techniques, including equity swaps, derivatives, futures contracts, and rebalancing, and re-indexing.

The rebalancing and re-indexing of leveraged ETFs may have considerable costs when markets are volatile. Leveraged ETFs effectively increase exposure ahead of a losing session and decrease exposure ahead of a winning session. The rebalancing problem is that the fund manager incurs trading losses because he needs to buy when the index goes up and sell when the index goes down in order to maintain a fixed leverage ratio. A 2.5% daily change in the index will for example reduce value of a -2x bear fund by about 0.18% per day, which means that about a third of the fund may be wasted in trading losses within a year (1-(1-0.18%)252=36.5%). Investors may however circumvent this problem by buying or writing futures directly, accepting a varying leverage ratio. A more reasonable estimate of daily market changes is 0.5%, which leads to a 2.6% yearly loss of principal in a 3x leveraged fund.

The re-indexing problem of leveraged ETFs stems from the arithmetic effect of volatility of the underlying index. Take, for example, an index that begins at 100 and a 2X fund based on that index that also starts at 100. In a first trading period (for example, a day), the index rises 10% to 110. The 2X fund will then rise 20% to 120. The index then drops back to 100 (a drop of 9.09%), so that it is now even. The drop in the 2X fund will be 18.18% (2*9.09). But 18.18% of 120 is 21.82. This puts the value of the 2X fund at 98.18. Even though the index is unchanged after two trading periods, an investor in the 2X fund would have lost 1.82%. This decline in value can be even greater for inverse funds (leveraged funds with negative multipliers such as -1, -2, or -3). It always occurs when the change in value of the underlying index changes direction. And the decay in value increases with volatility of the underlying index.

The effect of leverage is also reflected in the pricing of options written on leveraged ETFs. In particular, the terminal payoff of a leveraged ETF European/American put or call depends on the realized variance (hence the path) of the underlying index. The impact of leverage ratio can also be observed from the implied volatility surfaces of leveraged ETF options. For instance, the implied volatility curves of inverse leveraged ETFs (with negative multipliers such as -1, -2, or -3) are commonly observed to be increasing in strike, which is characteristically different from the implied volatility smiles or skews seen for index options or non-leveraged ETF options.

In May 2017, the SEC granted approval of two 4x leveraged ETF related to S&P 500 futures, the ForceShares Daily 4X US Market Futures Long Fund, and ForceShares Daily 4X US Market Futures Short Fund, before rescinding the approval a few weeks later.

In November 2019, the SEC proposed a rule regarding the use of derivatives that would make it easier for leveraged and inverse ETFs to come to market, including eliminating a liquidity rule to cover obligations of derivatives positions, replacing it with a risk management program overseen by a derivatives risk manager. The SEC also proposed rules requiring investors to answer a series of questions before being permitted to invest in leveraged ETFs.

Thematic ETFs 
Thematic ETFs typically focus on long-term, societal trends, such as disruptive technologies, climate change, or shifting consumer behaviors. Some of the most popular themes include cloud computing, robotics, and electric vehicles, as well as the gig economy, e-commerce, and clean energy. As of June 2019, 13 U.S.-listed thematic ETFs held more than US$1 billion in assets and another nine held more than US$500 million. In Canada, no Canadian-listed thematic ETF holds more than $500 million, with the fund category holding about $2.5 billion as of January 2020.

History
ETFs had their genesis in 1989 with Index Participation Shares (IPS), an S&P 500 proxy that traded on the American Stock Exchange and the Philadelphia Stock Exchange. This product was short-lived after a lawsuit by the Chicago Mercantile Exchange was successful in stopping sales in the United States. The argument against the IPS approach was that it resembled a futures contract because the investments held an index, rather than holding the actual underlying stocks. 

In 1990, a similar product, Toronto Index Participation Shares, which tracked the TSE 35 and later the TSE 100 indices, started trading on the Toronto Stock Exchange (TSE) in 1990. The popularity of these products led the American Stock Exchange to try to develop something that would satisfy regulations by the U.S. Securities and Exchange Commission.

Nathan Most and Steven Bloom, under the direction of Ivers Riley, and with the assistance of Kathleen Moriarty, designed and developed Standard & Poor's Depositary Receipts, which were introduced in January 1993. Known as SPDRs or "Spiders", the fund became the largest ETF in the world. In May 1995, State Street Global Advisors introduced the S&P 400 MidCap SPDRs.

Barclays, in conjunction with MSCI and Funds Distributor Inc., entered the market in 1996 with World Equity Benchmark Shares (WEBS), which became iShares MSCI Index Fund Shares. WEBS originally tracked 17 MSCI country indices managed by the funds' index provider, Morgan Stanley. WEBS were particularly innovative because they gave casual investors easy access to foreign markets. While SPDRs were organized as unit investment trusts, WEBS were set up as a mutual fund, the first of their kind.

In 1998, State Street Global Advisors introduced "Sector Spiders", separate ETFs for each of the sectors of the S&P 500. Also in 1998, the "Dow Diamonds" were introduced, tracking the Dow Jones Industrial Average. In 1999, the influential "cubes" was launched, with the goal of replicate the price movement of the NASDAQ-100 – originally QQQQ but later .

The iShares line was launched in early 2000. By 2005, it had a 44% market share of ETF assets under management. Barclays Global Investors was sold to BlackRock in 2009.

In 2001, The Vanguard Group entered the market by launching the Vanguard Total Stock Market ETF, which owns every publicly traded stock in the United States. Some of Vanguard's ETFs are a share class of an existing mutual fund.

iShares issued the first bond funds in July 2002: iShares IBoxx $ Invest Grade Corp Bond Fund, which owns corporate bonds, and a TIPS fund. In 2007, iShares introduced an ETF that owns high-yield debt and an ETF that owns municipal bonds and State Street Global Advisors and The Vanguard Group also issued bond ETFs.

In December 2005, Rydex (now Invesco) launched the first currency ETF, the Euro Currency Trust, which tracked the value of the Euro. In 2007, Deutsche Bank's db x-trackers launched the EONIA Total Return Index ETF in Frankfurt tracking the Euro. In 2008, it launched the Sterling Money Market ETF and US Dollar Money Market ETF in London. In November 2009, ETF Securities launched the world's largest FX platform tracking the MSFXSM Index covering 18 long or short USD ETC vs. single G10 currencies.

The first leveraged ETF was issued by ProShares in 2006.

In 2008, the SEC authorized the creation of ETFs that use active management strategies. Bear Stearns launched the first actively managed ETF, the Current Yield ETF, which began trading on the American Stock Exchange on March 25, 2008.

In December 2014, assets under management by U.S. ETFs reached $2 trillion. By November 2019, assets under management by U.S. ETFs reached $4 trillion. Assets under management by U.S. ETFs grew to $5.5 trillion by January 2021.

Gold
The first gold exchange-traded product was Central Fund of Canada, a closed-end fund founded in 1961. It amended its articles of incorporation in 1983 to provide investors with a product for ownership of gold and silver bullion. It has been listed on the Toronto Stock Exchange since 1966 and the American Stock Exchange since 1986.

The idea of a gold ETF was first conceptualized by Benchmark Asset Management Company Private Ltd in India, which filed a proposal with the Securities and Exchange Board of India in May 2002. In March 2007 after delays in obtaining regulatory approval. The first gold exchange-traded fund was Gold Bullion Securities launched on the ASX in 2003, and the first silver exchange-traded fund was iShares Silver Trust launched on the NYSE in 2006. SPDR Gold Shares, a commodity ETF, is in the top 10 largest ETFs by assets under management.

Arbitrage
Unlike mutual funds, ETFs do not sell or redeem their individual shares at net asset value. Instead, financial institutions purchase and redeem ETF shares directly from the ETF, but only in large blocks (such as 50,000 shares), called creation units. Purchases and redemptions of the creation units generally are in kind, with the institutional investor contributing or receiving a basket of securities of the same type and proportion held by the ETF, although some ETFs may require or permit a purchasing or redeeming shareholder to substitute cash for some or all of the securities in the basket of assets.

The ability to purchase and redeem creation units gives ETFs an arbitrage mechanism intended to minimize the potential deviation between the market price and the net asset value of ETF shares. ETFs generally have transparent portfolios, so institutional investors know exactly what portfolio assets they must assemble if they wish to purchase a creation unit, and the exchange disseminates the updated net asset value of the shares throughout the trading day, typically at 15-second intervals. ETF distributors only buy or sell ETFs directly from or to authorized participants, which are large broker-dealers with whom they have entered into agreements—and then, only in creation units, which are large blocks of tens of thousands of ETF shares, usually exchanged in-kind with baskets of the underlying securities. Authorized participants may wish to invest in the ETF shares for the long term, but they usually act as market makers on the open market, using their ability to exchange creation units with their underlying securities to provide market liquidity of the ETF shares and help ensure that their intraday market price approximates the net asset value of the underlying assets. Other investors, such as individuals using a retail broker, trade ETF shares on this secondary market.

If there is strong investor demand for an ETF, its share price will temporarily rise above its net asset value per share, giving arbitrageurs an incentive to purchase additional creation units from the ETF and sell the component ETF shares in the open market. The additional supply of ETF shares reduces the market price per share, generally eliminating the premium over net asset value. A similar process applies when there is weak demand for an ETF: its shares trade at a discount from net asset value.

When new shares of an ETF are created due to increased demand, this is referred to as ETF inflows. When ETF shares are converted into the component securities, this is referred to as ETF outflows.

ETFs are dependent on the efficacy of the arbitrage mechanism in order for their share price to track net asset value.

Risks

Tracking error
The ETF tracking error is the difference between the returns of the ETF and its reference index or asset. A non-zero tracking error therefore represents a failure to replicate the reference as stated in the ETF prospectus. The tracking error is computed based on the prevailing price of the ETF and its reference. It is different from the premium/discount which is the difference between the ETF's NAV (updated only once a day) and its market price. Tracking errors are more significant when the ETF provider uses strategies other than full replication of the underlying index. Some of the most liquid equity ETFs tend to have better tracking performance because the underlying index is also sufficiently liquid, allowing for full replication. In contrast, some ETFs, such as commodities ETFs and their leveraged ETFs, do not necessarily employ full replication because the physical assets cannot be stored easily or used to create a leveraged exposure, or the reference asset or index is illiquid. Futures-based ETFs may also suffer from negative roll yields, as seen in the VIX futures market.

While tracking errors are generally non-existent for the most popular ETFs, they have existed during periods of market turbulence such as in late 2008 and 2009 and during flash crashes, particularly for ETFs that invest in foreign or emerging-market stocks, future-contracts based commodity indices, and high-yield debt. In November 2008, during a period of market turbulence, some lightly traded ETFs frequently had deviations of 5% or more, exceeding 10% in a handful of cases, although even for these niche ETFs, the average deviation was only a little more than 1%. The trades with the greatest deviations tended to be made immediately after the market opened. Per Morgan Stanley, in 2009, ETFs missed their targets by an average of 1.25 percentage points, a gap more than twice as wide as the 0.52-percentage-point average they posted in 2008.

Liquidity risk
ETFs have a wide range of liquidity. The most popular ETFs (such as those tracking the S&P 500) are constantly traded, with tens of millions of shares per day changing hands, while others trade in much lower numbers. There are many ETFs that do not trade very often, and thus might be difficult to sell compared to more liquid ETFs. The most active ETFs are very liquid, with high regular trading volume and tight bid-ask spreads (the gap between buyer and seller's prices), and the price thus fluctuates throughout the day. This is in contrast with mutual funds, where all purchases or sales on a given day are executed at the same price at the end of the trading day.

New regulations to force ETFs to be able to manage systemic stresses were put in place following the 2010 flash crash, when prices of ETFs and other stocks and options became volatile, with trading markets spiking and bids falling as low as a penny a share in what the Commodity Futures Trading Commission (CFTC) investigation described as one of the most turbulent periods in the history of financial markets.

These regulations proved to be inadequate to protect investors in the August 24, 2015, flash crash, "when the price of many ETFs appeared to come unhinged from their underlying value." ETFs were consequently put under even greater scrutiny by regulators and investors. Analysts at Morningstar, Inc. claimed in December 2015 that "ETFs are a 'digital-age technology' governed by 'Depression-era legislation".

Risks of synthetic ETFs
Synthetic ETFs, which do not own securities but track indexes using derivatives and swaps, have raised concern due to lack of transparency in products and increasing complexity; conflicts of interest; and lack of regulatory compliance.

Counterparty risk
A synthetic ETF has counterparty risk, because the counterparty is contractually obligated to match the return on the index. The deal is arranged with collateral posted by the swap counterparty. A potential hazard is that the investment bank offering the ETF might post its own collateral, and that collateral could be of dubious quality. Furthermore, the investment bank could use its own trading desk as counterparty. These types of set-ups are not allowed under the European guidelines, Undertakings for Collective Investment in Transferable Securities Directive 2009 (UCITS).

Counterparty risk is also present where the ETF engages in securities lending or total return swaps.

Effects on price stability
Purchases and sales of commodities by ETFs can significantly affect the price of such commodities.

Per the International Monetary Fund, "Some market participants believe the growing popularity of exchange-traded funds (ETFs) may have contributed to equity price appreciation in some emerging economies, and warn that leverage embedded in ETFs could pose financial stability risks if equity prices were to decline for a protracted period."

Some critics claim that ETFs can be, and have been, used to manipulate market prices, such as in conjunction with short selling that contributed to the United States bear market of 2007–2009.

Perception and adoption of ETFs in the European market
The first European ETF came on the market in 2000 and the European ETF market has seen tremendous growth since. At the end of March 2019, the asset under management in the European industry stood at €760bn, compared with an amount of €100bn at the end of 2008. The market share of ETFs has increased significantly in recent years. At the end of March 2019, ETFs account for 8.6% of total AUM in investment funds in Europe, up from 5.5% five years earlier.

The use of ETFs has also evolved over time, as shown by regular observations of investment professionals’ practices in Europe. EDHEC surveys show an increasing propagation of ETF adoption over the years, especially for traditional asset classes. While ETFs are now used across a wide spectrum of asset classes, in 2019 the main use is currently in the area of equities and sectors, for 91% (45% in 2006) and 83% of the survey respondents, respectively. This is likely to be linked to the popularity of indexing in these asset classes, as well as to the fact that equity indices and sector indices are based on highly liquid instruments, which makes it straightforward to create ETFs on such underlying securities. The other asset classes for which a large share of investors declare using ETFs are commodities and corporate bonds (68% for them both, to be compared with 6% and 15% in 2006, respectively), smart beta-factor investing and government bonds (66% for them both, to be compared with 13% for government bonds in 2006).
Investors have a high rate of satisfaction with ETFs, especially for traditional asset classes. In 2019, we observe 95% satisfaction for both equities and government bond asset.

The role of ETFs in the asset allocation process
Over the years, EDHEC survey results have consistently indicated that ETFs were used as part of a truly passive investment approach, mainly for long-term buy-and-hold investment, rather than tactical allocation. However, over the past three years, the two approaches have gradually become more balanced and, in 2019, European investment professionals declare that their use of ETFs for tactical allocation is actually greater than for long term positions (53% and 51% respectively).

ETFs, which originally replicated broad market indices, are now available in a wide variety of asset classes and a multitude of market sub-segments (sectors, styles, etc.) If gaining broad market exposure remains the main focus of ETFs for 73% of users in 2019, 52% of respondents declare using ETFs to obtain specific sub-segment exposure. The diversity of ETFs increases the possibilities of using ETFs for tactical allocation. Investors can easily increase or decrease their portfolio exposure to a specific style, sector, or factor at lower cost with ETFs. The more volatile the markets are, the more interesting it is to use low cost instruments for tactical allocation, especially that cost is a major criterion for selecting an ETF provider for 88% of respondents.

Expectations for ETF future developments in Europe
Despite a high current adoption rate of ETFs and the already high maturity of this market, a high percentage of investors (46%) still plan to increase their use of ETFs in the future, according to the EDHEC 2019 survey responses. Investors are planning to increase their ETF allocation to replace active managers (71% of respondents in 2019), but are also seeking to replace other passive investing products through ETFs (42% of respondents in 2019). Lowering costs is the main motivation for increasing the use of ETFs for 74% of investors.
Investors are especially demanding for further developments of ETF products in the area of Ethical/SRI and smart beta equity / factor indices. In 2018, ESG ETFs enjoyed growth of 50%, reaching €9.95bn, with the launch of 36 new products, against just 15 in 2017. However, 31% of the EDHEC 2019 survey respondents still require additional ETF products based on sustainable investment, which appears to be their top concern.

Investors are also demanding for ETFs related to advanced forms of equity indices, namely those based on multi-factor and smart beta indices (30% and 28% of respondents, respectively), and 45% of respondents would like to see further developments in at least one category related to smart beta equity or factor indices (smart beta indices, single-factor indices and multi-factor indices).
Consistent with the desire to use ETFs for passive exposure to broad market indices, only 19% of respondents show any interest in future development of actively managed equity ETFs.

Notable issuers of ETFs

 AdvisorShares: issues actively managed ETFs only, majority owned by Fund.com
 ARK Investment Management: issues actively managed ETFs that invest in companies involved in disruptive innovation
 Banco Itau: issues ETFs in Brazil
 BetaShares: issues ETFs in Australia
 Bips Investment Managers: issues Bips (Beta Investment Performance Securities) in South Africa
 BlackRock: issues iShares
 BNP Paribas: issues EasyETFs in Europe
 Boost ETP: issues short (inverse) and leveraged exchange-traded products including 3X equity and commodity products in Europe
 Charles Schwab Corporation: issues ETFs
 Deutsche Bank: issues Xtrackers ETFs, and manages PowerShares DB commodity- and currency-based ETFs
 ETF Securities: issues ETFs primarily in Australia
 Franklin Templeton Investments: Issues LibertyShares® ETFs
 Global X Funds: issues ETFs
 Guggenheim Partners: issues specialty Guggenheim Funds ETFs
 Indo Premier Investment Management: issues Premier ETFs in Indonesia Stock Exchange
 Invesco: issues Invesco ETFs, as well as BLDRS based on American depositary receipts
 KraneShares: issues China and climate focused ETFs
 Lyxor Asset Management: issues Lyxor ETFs in France
 Natixis Investment Managers: issues Active International Minimum Volatility ETF (MVIN) and Active Short Duration Income ETF (LSST)
 NextFins: issues Nifty India Financials ETF (INDF)
 Standard Life Aberdeen: issues commodity ETFs
 State Street Global Advisors: issues SPDRs
 The Vanguard Group: issues Vanguard ETFs, formerly known as VIPERs
 United States Commodity Funds: issues commodity ETFs such as the United States Oil Fund
 Van Eck Global: issues Market Vectors ETFs
 WisdomTree Investments: issues specialty ETFs
 MicroSectors: issues leveraged and inverse ETNs

See also
 Exchange for ETF (EFETF) – a method in which market makers exchange their ETFs for futures contracts.
 Exchange-traded note (ETN)

References

Further reading
 Carrell, Lawrence. ETFs for the Long Run: What They Are, How They Work, and Simple Strategies for Successful Long-Term Investing. Wiley, September 9, 2008. 
 Ferri, Richard A. The ETF Book: All You Need to Know About Exchange-Traded Funds. Wiley, January 4, 2011. 
 Humphries, William. Leveraged ETFs: The Trojan Horse Has Passed the Margin-Rule Gates. 34 Seattle U.L. Rev. 299 (August 31, 2010), available at Seattle University Law Review.
 Koesterich, Russ. The ETF Strategist: Balancing Risk and Reward for Superior Returns. Penguin Books, May 29, 2008. 
 Lemke, Thomas P.; Lins, Gerald T. & McGuire, W. John. Regulation of Exchange-Traded Funds. LexisNexis, 2015.

External links
 A brief history of ETFs – Trackinsight
 Exchange Traded Funds (ETF) – Australian Stock Exchange (ASX)
 Exchange Traded Funds (ETF) – Johannesburg Stock Exchange (JSE)
 Exchange Traded Funds (ETF) – London Stock Exchange (LSE)
 Exchange Traded Funds (ETF) – Toronto Stock Exchange (TSX)
 Exchange Traded Products – New York Stock Exchange
 Funds + ETFs – NASDAQ Stock Market
 The ETF Hall of Fame: 25 People Who Revolutionized the ETF Industry – ETF Database
 What are ETFs? – Trackinsight